Castra of Bumbești-Jiu may refer to:
 Castra of Bumbești-Jiu - Gară, a fort in the Roman province of Dacia
 Castra of Bumbești-Jiu - Vârtop, a fort in the Roman province of Dacia

See also
 Castra of Porceni